Centre for Research and Popular Service (CISEP) was founded by the Jesuits in 1984 in Oruro, Bolivia, in response to the nationalization of mines, for the preservation of jobs and development of alternatives in the urban labor sector. CISEP works at the national and regional level on issues of research, environment, cultural promotion, and citizenship.

References  

Jesuit development centres
Organisations based in Bolivia
Organizations established in 1984